Iana Lebiedieva (born 12 February 1984) is a Ukrainian Paralympic athlete competing in F53-classification events. She won the silver medal in the women's discus throw F53 event at the 2020 Summer Paralympics in Tokyo, Japan.

She is a two-time silver medalist at the World Para Athletics Championships and a four-time medalist, including two golds, at the World Para Athletics European Championships.

References

External links 
 

Living people
1984 births
Place of birth missing (living people)
Ukrainian female discus throwers
Ukrainian female javelin throwers
Ukrainian female shot putters
Medalists at the World Para Athletics European Championships
Medalists at the World Para Athletics Championships
Paralympic athletes of Ukraine
Athletes (track and field) at the 2020 Summer Paralympics
Medalists at the 2020 Summer Paralympics
Paralympic silver medalists for Ukraine
Wheelchair discus throwers
Wheelchair javelin throwers
Wheelchair shot putters
21st-century Ukrainian women
Paralympic discus throwers
Paralympic javelin throwers
Paralympic shot putters